Maia Wiig-Hansen (2 January 1880 – 21 February 1962) was a Norwegian artist. Her work was part of the art competition at the 1932 Summer Olympics. She exhibited at the Society of Independent Artists in 1938.

References

1880 births
1962 deaths
Norwegian women artists
Olympic competitors in art competitions
People from Moss, Norway